Fragmentations, Prayers and Interjections is an album composed by John Zorn and featuring the Arcana Orchestra which was recorded in New York City in 2013 and released on the Tzadik label in March 2014. The album was recorded at Columbia University's Miller Theatre as part of the Zorn@60 Celebrations. The piece Kol Nidre is a tune from Zorn's Masada songbook.

Reception

PopMatters reviewer Alex Franquelli stated "Fragmentations, Prayers & Interjections is an amazing collection of ideas, rather than an album per se. Its lack of consistency undeniably constitutes an asset, rather than a disadvantage, as is often the case with the music written by one of the most prolific tunesmiths of our era. Zorn proves that he has yet to explore the numerous opportunities given by orchestral arrangements, and that the time is probably right for him to start developing a new path in his career".

Track listing
All compositions by John Zorn.

 "Orchestra Variations" - 5:20   
 "Contes de Fées" - 12:30   
 "Kol Nidre" - 8:12   
 "Suppôts et Suppliciations" - 20:12

Personnel

Arcana Orchestra
Barry Crawford, Claire Chase, Sooyun Kim, Tara Helen O'Connor - piccolo, flute, alto flute, bass flute
Arthur Sato, Christa Robinson, Jeffrey Reinhardt, Scott Bartucca - oboe, English horn
Alicia Lee, Campbell MacDonald, Carol McGonnell, Joshua Rubin, Rane Moore - clarinet, bass clarinet
Adrian Morejon, Brad Balliett, Natalie Pilla, Rebekah Heller - bassoon, contrabassoon
David Peel, Jon Carroll, Kate Sheeran, Rachel Drehmann - French horn
Gareth Flowers, Nathan Botts, Peter Evans, Wayne Dumaine - trumpet
Dave Nelson, Kenn Finn, Sam Armstrong - trombone
Dave Taylor - bass trombone
Dan Peck - tuba
Alex Lipowski, Matthew Gold, Michael Truesdell, William Winant - percussion 
Adda Kridler, Ari Streisfeld, Arthur Moeller, Asmira Woodward-Page, Brendan Speltz, Caroline Chin, Christopher Otto, Clara Lyon, Conrad Harris, Elizabeth Derham, Emilie-Anne Gendron, Erik Carlson, Esther Noh, Jennifer Choi, Joshua Modney, Joyce Hammann, Kathryn Andersen, Ken Hamao, Nicole Jeong, Olivia De Prato, Owen Dalby, Pauline Kim, Tom Chiu, William Knuth, Yon Joo Lee, Yuki Numata Resnick - violin
Ah Ling Neu, David Wallace, Denise Stillwell, Gillian Gallagher, Jen Herman, Jocelin Pan, John Pickford Richards, Stephanie Griffin, Victor Lowrie, William Hakim - viola
Christopher Gross, Erik Friedlander, Felix Fan, Fred Sherry, Jay Campbell, Jeffrey Zeigler, Kevin McFarland, Mariel Roberts, Meghan Burke, Michael Nicolas - cello
Andrew Roitstein, Brian Ellingsen, Doug Balliett, Kris Saebo, Randall Zigler, Zachary Hobin - bass
Bridget Kibbey - harp
Steven Beck - piano, harpsichord, celeste, organ 
David Fulmer - conductor

Production
Silas Brown - engineer, audio mixer
John Zorn and Kazunori Sugiyama – producers

References
 

2014 live albums
John Zorn live albums
Albums produced by John Zorn
Tzadik Records live albums